Kim Gwan-hyeon (born 7 February 1955) is a South Korean judoka. He competed in the men's open category event at the 1984 Summer Olympics.

References

1955 births
Living people
South Korean male judoka
Olympic judoka of South Korea
Judoka at the 1984 Summer Olympics
Place of birth missing (living people)
20th-century South Korean people